The men's 10 kilometres walk event at the 1948 Summer Olympic Games took place from 3 to 7 August. The final was won by Swede John Mikaelsson. This was the first time since 1924 the event took place.

Records
Prior to the competition, the existing World and Olympic records were as follows.

The following new Olympic record was set during this competition:

Schedule
All times are British Summer Time (UTC+1)

Results

Round 1
Round 1 took place on 3 August. The first five competitors from each heat advanced to the final.

Heat 1

Heat 2

Final

Key: DSQ = Disqualified

References

External links
Organising Committee for the XIV Olympiad, The (1948). The Official Report of the Organising Committee for the XIV Olympiad. LA84 Foundation. Retrieved 5 September 2016.

Athletics at the 1948 Summer Olympics
Racewalking at the Olympics
Men's events at the 1948 Summer Olympics